Donald Daniel Dorfman (June 11, 1933 – April 15, 2001) was an American mathematical psychologist and radiologist known for his research on signal detection theory.

Education and career
Born in Philadelphia, Pennsylvania, Dorfman graduated Phi Beta Kappa from the University of Pennsylvania in 1954. He received his master's degree and Ph.D. from the University of Michigan in 1957 and 1961, respectively. In 1962, he joined the faculty of San Diego State University, where he remained until 1968, when he joined the University of Iowa's faculty. He became a professor of psychology at the University of Iowa in 1974 and a professor of radiology there in 1991.

References

External links
Biography at University of Iowa website

1933 births
2001 deaths
20th-century American psychologists
University of Iowa faculty
San Diego State University faculty
Scientists from Philadelphia
University of Pennsylvania alumni
University of Michigan alumni
American radiologists
Deaths from cancer in Iowa
Deaths from lymphoma